The following table shows the world record progression in the mixed 4 x 400 metres relay. The first world record in the event was recognised by the International Association of Athletics Federations in 2019.

Prior to Official Recognition

Officially Recognised

References

World athletics record progressions
World record mixed